Idu is both a central village and the headquarters of Uruan local government area of Akwa Ibom state in Nigeria.

Idu is politically segmented to belong to Uruan Central Ward 1.Weather: 27 °C, Wind S at 10 km/h, 82% Humidity weather.com

Local Government Area: Uruan Ward: Uruan Central Ward 1

References 

Populated places in Akwa Ibom State
Villages in Akwa Ibom